Javed Jabbar (Urdu:  جاوید جبار  ) is a Pakistani writer and politician.

Early life and education 
Jabbar's father Ahmed Abdul Jabbar was under the employment of Hyderabad State; they migrated to Pakistan after India annexed the state. His mother Zain Mahal Khursheed was a trained Sitar player. Jabbar credits both of them for inculcating his interest in art and literature.

In 1961, Jabbar enrolled in the Humanities section of St Patrick's High School, Karachi; he credited Principal D'Arcy D'Souza with convincing his father into shifting him from the Commerce section, where he was first enrolled. In 1963, Jabbar enrolled at the University of Karachi for his undergraduate degree in International Relations. During his university-days, he was a reputed face in theatrical circuits.

Career

Advertisement, Documentaries and Films
Jabbar chose to be employed in the advertisement sector instead of journalism, guided by better prospects of earning. He went on to direct over 300 commercials. In 1972, Jabbar produced Moenjodaro: The City That Must Not Die, a documentary for Pakistan television (PTV). A chronicle of Indus Valley civilisation, it won the Silver Prize at the Asian Film Festival in Shiraz, Iran and a national award. He had also directed 10 other documentaries.

In 1976, he wrote and directed Beyond the Last Mountain, the first feature film in English out of Pakistan. In 2008, he directed Ramchand Pakistani, an Urdu drama film that centered on the ordeals of a Pakistani Dalit Hindu, who had crossed the border to India.

Politics 
in 1985—spurred by his wife and friends—Jabbar successfully ran for the four seats reserved for technocrats in Pakistan Senate under the martial rule of Zia-ul-Haq. He won re-elections in 1997; he even became a Minister of State of Information in the Musharraf ministry before resigning in 2000. In 2003, he tried to be reelected but failed to obtain any proposer.

Books 
In 2021, he drafted a biography of Benazir Bhutto.

Views

Pakistan

Islam 
Jabbar believes that the prominent strand of Islam followed in Pakistan is Sufism — "pluralistic, inclusive, tolerant, [and] respectful." Rejecting that Pakistani society has any major issue of radicalization, he warns against conflating the "overwhelming majority" of peaceful and resilient Pakistanis with "a small number of brainwashed barbarians." He argues that most Pakistanis respect other religions since otherwise, colleges run by Christian missionaries won't have got thousands of students or religio-political parties would have won elections; acts of violence upon accusations of blasphemy were rare.

Jabbar rejects contentions that Pakistan is a failed state; he remains hopeful that Pakistan will successfully see through the unique challenges of being founded on the basis of religion yet not give in to religious extremism or Islamicise the state to even-greater extents. He asks his fellow citizens to enroll for a high-quality education, engage in ijtihad, and follow a "50 points formula" in their quest for rediscovering and redefining Pakistaniat.

Media 
In 2016, Jabbar supported PEMRA's proscription on broadcasting Indian media in Pakistan. Jabbar believes the state to offer "very high levels of freedom of expression" to media despite the rare blips.

India 
Jabbar blames India's maneuvers in the immediate aftermath of the Partition—1947 Kashmir War—, to have influenced Pakistan into becoming a "security-oriented state." He hopes that India will engage with Pakistan more meaningfully and without holding discussions hostage to "[Pakistan's] cessation of support for terrorism."

1971 and Bangladesh 
.

Personal life 
Jabbar is married to Shabnam. They have a son named Kamal and a daughter Mehreen Jabbar who is a film producer and director.

References

External links

Year of birth missing (living people)
Living people
Pakistani male journalists
Pakistani screenwriters
Pakistani film producers
Pakistani film directors
St. Patrick's College (Karachi) alumni
Writers from Karachi
Muhajir people
Pakistani media personalities
Pakistani people of Hyderabadi descent
People from Karachi
Federal ministers of Pakistan